Azal  may refer to:

 Azal Branco, a white Portuguese wine grape
 Azal Tinto, a red Portuguese wine grape
 Azal (Bible), a location mentioned in the Book of Zechariah
 Azerbaijan Airlines, also known as AZAL
Buta Airways, formerly AZALJet, a subsidiary of Azerbaijan Airlines